Gorbovo is a rural locality (a village) in Sosnovskoye Rural Settlement, Vologodsky District, Vologda Oblast, Russia. The population was 8 as of 2002.

Geography 
The distance to Vologda is 24 km, to Sosnovka is 4.5 km. Stepanovo, Medvedevo, Soroshnevo, Molitvino, Ispravino are the nearest rural localities.

References 

Rural localities in Vologodsky District